Institutes of technology and polytechnics have existed at least since the 18th century, but became popular after World War II with the expansion of engineering education and technical education, associated with the new needs created by industrialization. In some cases, polytechnics or institutes of technology are engineering schools or technical.

A handful of American universities include the phrases "Institute of Technology", "Polytechnic Institute", "Polytechnic University", or similar phrasing in their names; these are generally research-intensive universities with a focus on science, technology, engineering, and mathematics. The level of academic rigor in these schools may vary from regional state universities to elite schools.

Institutions

Notes

References 

Technological Universities
Technological Universities